Boxholm (traditionally also) is a locality and the seat of Boxholm Municipality, Östergötland County, Sweden with 3,194 inhabitants in 2010.

Economy
Steel production company Ovako has a production site in Boxholm with approximately 200 employees.

Sports
The following sports clubs are located in Boxholm:

 Boxholms IF

References

External links 

 

Boxholm Municipality
Populated places in Östergötland County
Populated places in Boxholm Municipality
Municipal seats of Östergötland County
Swedish municipal seats